Frank Siedel (5 September 1914 – 9 May 1988) was an American writer, historian, educator, and broadcaster. Siedel wrote over 1,500 movie, radio, and television scripts and three historical novels.

In 1947, Siedel created and wrote the first scripts for what would turn out to be over 1,300 "Ohio Story" radio episodes. For five years, the 15-minute show was broadcast live three days a week from the studios of WTAM in Cleveland to a network of Ohio radio stations. In 1952 the format changed to 10 minutes a night, and the shows were pre-recorded for distribution to 20 Ohio radio stations. "Captain Dodge's Uncommon Courage," the last radio show, aired on 29 December 1955.

In June 1952, Siedel initiated a weekly television version of the Ohio Story. One hundred seventy-five Ohio Story TV episodes were produced.

Ray Culley of Cinécraft Productions, owner of a sponsored film studio in Cleveland, Ohio, directed the television episodes. Stuart Buchanan was the producer for both the radio and TV series. The narrator of the radio-TV series was initially Robert Waldrop, and later, Nelson Olmsted (1914–1982). William Ellis, Lee Templeton, and Leo Trefzger co-wrote with Siedel some of the later scripts. Anson Hardman, General Advertising Manager of Ohio Bell, coordinated the radio series project and did much of the early episode research. The radio and TV series sponsor for the entire run was the Ohio Bell Telephone Company.

The Ohio Story radio-TV series (1947-1961) is said to be the longest-running scripted regional radio/TV show of its time.

Four of Siedel's books were offshoots of the "Ohio Story" radio and television series.

In 2019, the Hagley Museum and Library started a project to digitize and post online the movies and TV episodes Siedel produced through Cinécraft Productions.

Early life
The son of Frank and Mary Ann Junglas Siedel, Frank Siedel was born in Strongsville, Ohio. Siedel attributed his home-spun story-telling style of writing to his experiences listening to the pot-bellied stove storytellers in his father's general store. He began his scriptwriting career in 1936 as a freelance writer, working for radio stations WHKC in Columbus, Ohio and WCAE in Pittsburgh, Pennsylvania. In 1940 he took a job with ESCAR Motion Pictures in Cleveland. When World War II broke out, he wrote scripts for over 100 armed forces training films.

Cinécraft and Storycraft years
In 1946, Siedel started working with Cinécraft Productions as a screenwriter and he founded Storycraft, Inc., a Cleveland-based scriptwriting company. Storycraft launched a number of young writers into successful careers. Bill Ellis and Jerry Turk were the first to join Siedel in Storycraft, Inc. Later, he added Lee Templeton, Leo Trefzger, Fred Lipp, and others.

Personal life
A longtime resident of Rocky River, Ohio, Siedel served as president of that suburb's board of education and, in 1955, was elected to the first State of Ohio Board of Education where he successfully fought to have Ohio history taught in public schools.

Siedel was married twice. Alyce Louise van den Mooter (1911 –1978) and Siedel had three children: sons James and Jonathan and daughter, Jeri Siedel Audiano. In 1982 he married Mardith Ray Jacobson [later Hany].
He died on Catawba Island, Ohio in 1988 and is buried in the Catawba Island Cemetery.

Publications

Notable Siedel TV and radio episodes
 1946 Crystal Clear. Sponsor: Fostoria Glass Company
 1947-1953	Ohio Story radio episodes. Sponsor: Ohio Bell Telephone Company
 1947	Naturally It's FM. Sponsor: General Electric Company
 1947	A Name You Can Trust in Rubber. Sponsor: Seiberling Rubber Company
 1948	Miracle on Mulberry Street. Sponsor: Seiberling Rubber Company
 1948	Moulders of Progress. Sponsor: Eljer Plumbing Company
 1950 Let's Explore Ohio TV series. Sponsor: Standard Oil of Ohio
 1951 Fasteners for Progress. Sponsor: Tinnerman Products Inc.
 1952-1961	Ohio Story TV Series. Sponsor: Ohio Bell Telephone Company
 1953 Freedom's Proving Grounds. Sponsor: Standard Oil of Ohio (SOHIO)
 1954	Milestones of Motoring. Sponsor: Standard Oil of Ohio
 1955	Land of Promise. Sponsor: Cleveland Electric Illuminating Company
 1959	Case Closed. Sponsor: Cleveland Department of Public Welfare
 1959	Cleveland World Port. Sponsor: Cleveland Electric Illuminating Company
 1962	Cleveland City on Schedule. Sponsor: Cleveland Development Foundation
 1964 	Invitation to Ohio. Sponsor: Ohio Bell Telephone Company
 1964	Search. Sponsor: Youngstown Sheet and Tube
 1966 	Cover the Earth. Sponsor: Sherwin-Williams Company
 1968	Ohio Heritage TV Series: Sponsor Standard Oil of Ohio
 1970	Projection 70 TV Series. Sponsor: Standard Oil of Ohio
 1970	The Spoilers. Sponsor: Super Market Institute
 1976	Work in Progress. Sponsor: American Iron and Steel Institute
 1978	Looking Good. Sponsor: Bonne Bell Company

References

External links
 Frank Siedel - Encyclopedia of Cleveland History (Case Western Reserve University)
 Online collection of Ohio Story Radio Scripts (Ohio Genealogical Society)
 Online collection of Frank Siedel Papers (Hagley Library Audiovisual Collection)
 Ohio Story Radio & TV Series (1947-1961) - Encyclopedia of Cleveland History (Case Western Reserve University)
American writers
American historians
American educators
American broadcasters